Skarsvåg Church is a chapel of the Church of Norway in Nordkapp Municipality in Troms og Finnmark county, Norway. It is located in the village of Skarsvåg on the northern end of the island of Magerøya. It is an annex chapel for the Nordkapp parish which is part of the Hammerfest prosti (deanery) in the Diocese of Nord-Hålogaland. The white, wooden church was built in a long church style in 1961 using plans drawn up by the architect Rolf Harlew Jenssen. The church seats about 60 people.

History
The first mention of the church in existing historical records was in 1589, but that was not the year the church was built. In 1748, the church was torn down. The new chapel was consecrated on 6 August 1961 by the Bishop Alf Wiig. The building was called Skarsvåg Chapel until 1999 when it was renamed as a "church".

Media gallery

See also
List of churches in Nord-Hålogaland

References

Nordkapp
Churches in Finnmark
Wooden churches in Norway
20th-century Church of Norway church buildings
Churches completed in 1961
1961 establishments in Norway
Long churches in Norway